Workpoint TV is Thailand's television station, owned by Workpoint Entertainment, broadcasting on channel 23 of Thailand's digital television.

History 
Workpoint Entertainment began to test their satellite TV broadcasting Channel for Workpoints TV On September 26 of 2011. Then on October 3 in the same year, the formal program plan was announced and originally began at the end of the test broadcasting period. After that, they officially began to broadcasting on January 1 of 2012, but due to the building's operation Workpoint Public Company Limited in Pathum Thani Province face a great flood so the schedule as mentioned above was postponed to February 20 in the same year. Later on  December 26 of 2013, Workpoint Plc. assigned to Thai Broadcasting Co.Ltd , which is a subsidiary participate in the auction of channels with broadcasting trade commission TV commercial business and then sort of a list in general both high-definition and  standard-definition image are available.

As a result, Thai Broadcasting Co.Ltd. won the auction for the typical clear picture type No. 23 and will begin testing terrestrial broadcasting on April 1 of 2014 along with most business operators.

Channel number adjustment 
The satellite and cable TV networks were processed by the Broadcasting Business Committee, or TV business, which included the National Telecommunications Business, or NBTC. by entering the first ten numbers and then digital television channels, which is a dish box for receiving PSI satellite signals. On April 1 of 2014 - November 15 of 2015, Workpoint channel is number 1, other satellite box models are number 33, and digital system is number 23. Workpoint channel number 33, which was Workpoint channel number 1 of the dish box intended for receiving PSI satellite signals, was removed from the satellite system, including cable. High definition and regular clear visuals are used in most programs. As a result, Thai Broadcasting Co., Ltd. sold basic clear images through auctions. Receiving PSI satellite signals with the dish box. has high-definition workstation channels. After that, the NBTC advised that the sharpness be adjusted. The Broadcasting Business Committee, TV business, and the National Telecommunications Commission, or NBTC, abolished 10 numbered channels from December 1, 2015 to the present. The first satellite dish. and number the channels in every system and platform with a single number so that viewers don't get confused about which workpoint television is number 23.

Business overview

Television program business can be divided into 3 types

Television program production business 
-Game Show is divided into 2 groups as follows: Game show in information and entertainment category and Game show in entertainment category.

-Quiz Show or Reality Show

-Sit Com

-Variety

-Cultural Show

-Drama

Satellite TV business

Digital Broadcasting Television Station Business 
The first trial broadcast was started on April 1, 2014 and officially broadcast on April 25, 2014 under the name “Channel 1 WORKPOINT”. Television programs broadcast on “Channel WORKPOINT” can be divided into two main categories.

Own production or outsourcing (Local Content) 
- Light Entertainment

- Sit Com/Drama

- News

Transactions that purchase copyrights from foreign countries 
- International program rights and broadcasting (Finished Program)

- Live broadcast rights

Image production and editing business is divided into 2 types.

Animation production and editing business 
operated by the Company Baan Ittirit Co., Ltd. aims to design and produce computerized animations. However, most of the work is contract manufacturing where the product depends on the form specified by the customer. Company's customers There are two types of House Itthirit: - Motion Picture Industry Company - Advertising production company (Production House)

Television filming and rental business

Movie business 
Each of the company's films has a presentation duration of 90-120 minutes in order to convey the story or script to the story. The movie production business of the Company can be divided into 2 groups

Movie production investment business 
Operated by Workpoint Pictures Co., Ltd. In the past films, Workpoint Pictures jointly invested in the production of many movies, such as Mum Deew, Hua Laem Square. Teng Nong Khon came to Hia, a little thing called love, and an animated movie titled Giant, etc. The guidelines for film production are as follows. - movie plot - film director

Theater and concert business 
The firm has previously hosted a number of concerts. Stage productions, as well as performances by domestic and international actor organizations including the Dream Theater, Pantomime, and GAMAJOBAT, which are made up of pantomime performers from Japan and other countries.

Organizing business 
The event planning business is a company that offers a wide range of event planning services.

News 
Workpoint TV started to have news programs via satellite in 2012 by hiring Matichon to produce the program. It started broadcasting on August 6 of 2012. Later, news stories were added at various times and hourly news was added at the end of 2015. Workpoint TV wanted to build their own news team. Therefore, the time of the news program which belonged to the original Matichon TV, was restored to produce all by themselves. By setting up a news team "Workpoint News" to produce news programs from 2016 to the present. Later on November 18 of 2019, a new program was launched. "Workpoint Today", an online news program of the "Workpoint News" team. Before the format of Workpoint News was transformed into a full-fledged online news agency under the name "Workpoint Today" in 2020 and separate the presentation area from the television news team originally renamed it. Workpoint 23 News, but still working together by Workpoint 23 News team, with the slogan "Truth comes first", which was introduced on March 3 of 2020.

References

External links

Television stations in Thailand
Television channels and stations established in 2011
Television channels and stations established in 2014